Adrian John Lim-Klumpes (born Adrian John Klumpes) is an Australian multi-instrumentalist who released his solo debut album, Be Still, in October 2006 on The Leaf Label.

Klumpes was a member of electronic jazz trio Triosk (2001–07) before starting his solo career. His next project was 3ofmillions, which released an album, Golden Calf 3, in 2008 on hellosQuare recordings.

From 2010 to 2015 he was a member of an improv group, Tangents. He issued his second solo album, Yield (Preludes and Fugues for Piano), in 2017.

Personal life

Since 2016 Adrian Klumpes performs under his married name, Adrian Lim-Klumpes.

Discography

References 

Year of birth missing (living people)
Living people
Australian pianists
21st-century pianists